The Moscow uprising, centered in Moscow's Presnia district between 7 and 17 December 1905, was the climax of the 1905 Russian Revolution. Thousands of workers joined in an armed rebellion against the imperial government for better societal conditions. The uprising ended in defeat for the revolutionaries and provoked a swift counter-revolution that lasted until 1907. The revolution of 1905 was a turning point in Russian history, and the Moscow Uprising played an important role in fostering revolutionary sentiment among Russian workers. The Moscow revolutionaries gained experience during the uprising that helped them succeed years later in the October Revolution of 1917.

Background 
Most left-wing revolutionaries viewed the October Manifesto as an attempt by Tsar Nicholas II to separate the middle and upper classes from the workers and peasants, whose social and political demands remained unanswered. Socialists continued to encourage revolutionary movements.

He immediately called for an armed uprising, indifferent to whether or not it succeeded:

The final provocation for the uprising was the arrest of the Saint Petersburg Soviet on 3 December.

Nicholas II's government knew an uprising was being planned but they allowed it as a justification to crush the revolutionaries. The Tsar wrote to his mother: "Although the events in Moscow are very distressing and cause me much pain, it seems to me that they are for the best."

Revolt 
Moscow's Bolsheviks, Mensheviks, and Socialist Revolutionaries planned a revolt on 5 December and hastily called a general strike on 7 December. The strike remained peaceful until December 9th.

Four Soviets of workers' deputies coordinated the uprising. The governor of Moscow, Vice Admiral Fyodor Dubasov, tried to arrest the ringleaders, which provoked a citywide uprising. The revolt was based in Maxim Gorky's apartment—bombs were made in the study and food for the revolutionaries in the kitchen. Gorky disliked the Bolsheviks' dogmatic collectivism but saw them as allies against backward peasants and the Tsar. The Joint Council of Volunteer Fighting Squads armed the workers with 800 stockpiled weapons. They constructed barricades from whatever they could find, including overturned trams. 2,000 men held the barricades with 200 guns. The police tried to dismantle them but failed. Students and even some bourgeois who were angered at the government's violence joined the workers.

December 9th: About 150 representatives of Moscow's worker squads gathered at Fidler's technical school, which served as the workers' "war ministry", where thousands of worker squads had received military training. Despite the besieged group waving a white flag, troops continued to shell Fidler from 10 p.m. to 3 a.m. Most workers were killed.

December 10th: The Socialist Revolutionaries bombed the Moscow Okhrana's headquarters at night.

December 11th: The Bolsheviks issued a handbook on street fighting. The military wing of the Moscow Committee of the Social-Democratic Workers' Party sent out a pamphlet to its members during the uprising: "Comrades, our top-priority task is to hand power in the city over to the people. In the section we have seized we'll establish an elected government and introduce the 8-hour work day. We shall prove that under our government the rights and freedoms of everyone will be protected better than they are now."

December 12th: Six out of seven railway stations and many districts were under revolutionary control. Fifty officers were seized as they arrived by train. Troops and artillery were hemmed in the squares and Kremlin.

December 15th: The head of the Moscow Okhrana was assassinated. The Moscow Soviet held its last meeting. The Semyonovsky Regiment of the Imperial Guard arrived in Moscow by rail from Saint Petersburg to reinforce the local garrison.

December 17th: Presnia was shelled.

December 18th: General Min ordered the last assault: "Act without mercy. There will be no arrests."

December 19th: The Moscow Committee of Social-Democratic Workers' Party ordered its comrades back to work. Presnia commander Litvin-Sedoy, issued a last announcement: "We are ending our struggle… we are alone in this world. All the people are looking at us — some with horror, others with deep sympathy. Blood, violence and death will follow in our footsteps. But it does not matter. The working class will win."

Aftermath 
Following the proclamation of the October Manifesto and the end of the Russo-Japanese War, there was limited hope for a socialist revolution, but the Moscow rebels of 1905 could have taken the Kremlin. They failed because each rebel area looked after its own and did not consider the city as a whole. The main rebel district was Presnia, home to 150,000 citizens, mainly textile workers. It organized its own police instead of attacking the Kremlin. Another key failure was that the Nikolayevsky railway station remained in government hands. This allowed the Semyonovsky Regiment to arrive from St. Petersburg on 15 December and destroy the uprising. The Moscow garrison remained unused due to the government's fear of a mutiny. The regiment shelled Presnia into submission after two days. On 18 December, the uprising was called off, followed by the general strike the next day. 35 soldiers were killed, while 1,059 rebels were killed, including 137 women and 86 children.

References

External links
 Vladimir Lenin: Lessons of the Moscow Uprising

1905 in the Russian Empire
1905 riots
1905 Russian Revolution
1900s in Moscow
December 1905 events
Moscow Governorate
Moscow rebellions
Riots and civil disorder in Russia
1905 protests